Sportbank (Ukrainian: спортба́нк) is a Ukrainian bank. After the Russian invasion of Ukraine in 2022, the bank redesigned its operations to allow easier donation to the Armed Forces of Ukraine. The bank was also the first member of eSupport, the Ukrainian government's COVID-19 stimulus program.

Overview 
Sportbank was launched in 2019 by Nick Izmailov and Denys Saprykin.

According to DELO business outlet, TASCOMGROUP has invested nearly $17m into the development of Sportbank. In 2019, Sportbank won the "Best Ukrainian FinTech-startup" award from PaySpace Magazine Awards. In December 2021 Sportbank joined Ukrainian government anti-COVID finance assistance program e-Support (єПідтримка). In June 2022, Sportbank, together with Run Ukraine, Binance, and other partners, launched an education project — Move-To-Earn. In August 2022, the number of customers reached 500,000.

Operations 
The bank operates as a neobank—almost all services are provided via mobile app. It was designed to focus on sports and sports related topics. Ukrainian goalkeeper of the national team Andriy Pyatovwas a brand ambassador for Sportbank.

The card is usually being delivered by a courier, who is an employee of the bank, or it can be delivered at Foxtrot retail chain or Nova Poshta postal service. Debit and credit Visa cards are emitted by Tascombank. In March 2022, the bank stopped financing cash back bonuses due to the invasion.

eSupport is a targeted assistance program from the government of Ukraine for Ukrainians. The card of the same name from Sportbank provides to transfer funds from the state.

References 

Banks of Ukraine